Tarapoto District is one of fourteen districts of the province San Martín in Peru.

References

See also 
  Administrative divisions of Peru